Royce Herbert Frith,  (November 12, 1923 – March 17, 2005) was a Canadian diplomat, public servant and politician.

He received a BA from the University of Toronto, an LL.B from Osgoode Hall Law School and a Dipl. d’études supérieures (droit) from the University of Ottawa. He was admitted to the Ontario Bar in 1949. An amateur actor and performer, Frith found time to act in plays, perform on the radio, and sing and play several instruments.

Frith first came to prominence as a member of the Royal Commission on Bilingualism and Biculturalism in the 1960s. He served as a legal advisor to the Commissioner of Official Languages from 1971 until 1977 when he was appointed to the Senate of Canada by Pierre Trudeau. He sat in the Upper House as a Liberal and served in various positions including Leader of the Opposition in the Canadian Senate and led the Liberals' filibuster against the introduction of the Goods and Services Tax forcing Prime Minister Brian Mulroney to use an obscure section of the Constitution to appoint extra Senators and ensure passage of the measure.

Frith left the Upper House in 1994 to become Canada's High Commissioner to the United Kingdom. Frith had a very high profile and used his flair for public performance to his advantage, particularly during Canada's Turbot War with Spain in which he played a crucial role in rallying British public opinion behind Canada. Frith also ensured the retention of Canada House in Trafalgar Square as the site of the Canadian high commission when the government had considered abandoning the location in order to save money. Frith returned to Canada in 1996 and resumed his law practice.

In his last years, Firth was a lawyer with the firm Ladner Downs in Vancouver and went into the office daily until just a few weeks prior to his death. He served on various boards including the Board of Trustees of the National Arts Centre in Ottawa.  Frith has also served on the governing bodies of the Lester B. Pearson United World College of the Pacific and the Vancouver Symphony. In 2000 he was appointed a member of the Order of Canada.

Bibliography

References

External links
 

1923 births
2005 deaths
University of Toronto alumni
Lawyers in Ontario
Canadian King's Counsel
Canadian Protestants
Canadian senators from Ontario
Liberal Party of Canada senators
Members of the Order of Canada
University of Ottawa alumni
High Commissioners of Canada to the United Kingdom